JAF (born Juan Antonio Ferreyra; July 29, 1958 in Buenos Aires, Argentina) is an Argentine rock singer and guitar player, who was part of the hard rock band Riff in the mid-80s.

Career
His first band was La Máquina Infernal. In 1979 he founded La Banda Marrón, with whom he played Deep Purple and Freddie King covers.
He was invited to join Riff in the mid-80s, as rhythm guitarist and singer.
After recording an album with Riff (Riff VII, 1985) and touring, JAF left the band and started a solo career. His first solo album Entrar en vos was released in 1989 by BMG Argentina. After his second LP Diapositivas was released in 1990, JAF had the opportunity to play for a large audience opening for Eric Clapton and Bryan Adams at River Plate Stadium.

Salida de emergencia (1991) was his third album. His fourth album: Me voy para el sur came out in 1992, followed by Hombre de blues. JAF was part of the "Homage to Carlos Gardel", organized held at Teatro Presidente Alvear, and organized by the Argentine Ministry of Culture. 
Corazón en llamas (1995) was his sixth album. JAF next album Número 7 was released on his own label. In 2019 JAF and bassist Vitico re-activated Riff for a few shows.

Discography
1989: Entrar en vos
1990: Diapositivas
1991: Salida de emergencia
1992: Me voy para el sur
1994: Hombre de blues
1995: Corazón en llamas
1997: Número 7
2003: Un largo camino
2005: JAF en vivo (Cd+DVD, live)
2006: Aire
2007: Uno +
2009: Supercharger
2010: JAF vivo! (Cd+DVD, live)
2013: Canciones de amor
2015: Tributo a Riff VII
2017: Instinto

References

External links

1958 births
Living people
20th-century Argentine male singers
Musicians from Buenos Aires
Argentine male singer-songwriters
Singers from Buenos Aires
Argentine rock musicians
Argentine heavy metal guitarists
Rock en Español musicians
21st-century Argentine male singers
Argentine people of Spanish descent
Argentine male guitarists